In mathematics, the Cheeger constant (also Cheeger number or isoperimetric number) of a graph is a numerical measure of whether or not a graph has a "bottleneck". The Cheeger constant as a measure of "bottleneckedness" is of great interest in many areas: for example, constructing well-connected networks of computers, card shuffling. The graph theoretical notion originated after the Cheeger isoperimetric constant of a compact Riemannian manifold.

The Cheeger constant is named after the mathematician Jeff Cheeger.

Definition
Let  be an undirected finite graph with vertex set  and edge set .

Note that the edges are unordered, i.e., .

The Cheeger constant is strictly positive if and only if  is a connected graph. Intuitively, if the Cheeger constant is small but positive, then there exists a "bottleneck", in the sense that there are two "large" sets of vertices with "few" links (edges) between them. The Cheeger constant is "large" if any possible division of the vertex set into two subsets has "many" links between those two subsets.

Example: computer networking

In applications to theoretical computer science, one wishes to devise network configurations for which the Cheeger constant is high (at least, bounded away from zero) even when  (the number of computers in the network) is large.

For example, consider a ring network of  computers, thought of as a graph . Number the computers  clockwise around the ring. Mathematically, the vertex set and the edge set are given by:

So,

and

Consequently, we would regard a ring network as highly "bottlenecked" for large , and this is highly undesirable in practical terms. We would only need one of the computers on the ring to fail, and network performance would be greatly reduced. If two non-adjacent computers were to fail, the network would split into two disconnected components.

Cheeger Inequalities
The Cheeger constant is especially important in the context of expander graphs as it is a way to measure the edge expansion of a graph. The so-called Cheeger inequalities relate the Eigenvalue gap of a graph with its Cheeger constant. More explicitly

The Cheeger inequality is a fundamental result and motivation for spectral graph theory.

See also 
 Spectral graph theory
 Algebraic connectivity
 Cheeger bound
 Conductance (graph)
 Connectivity (graph theory)
 Expander graph

References 

 
 

Computer network analysis
Graph invariants